The Newberry Springs CPV Power Plant is a 1.68 MWp (1.5 MWAC) concentrator photovoltaics (CPV) power station in Newberry Springs, California.

It was built by Blattner Energy using 60 dual-axis CX-S530 systems, each of which contains 12 CX-M500 modules.  

Each module contains 2,400 fresnel lenses to concentrate sunlight 500 times onto multi-junction solar cells, allowing a greater efficiency than other photovoltaic power plants.

The output is being sold to Southern California Edison under a 20-year Power Purchase Agreement.

Electricity production

See also

 Alamosa Solar Generating Project
 List of photovoltaic power stations
 Renewable energy in the United States
 Renewable portfolio standard
 Solar power in the United States

External links
 VIDEO: Newberry - Soitec's first solar power plant in California 
 STACE-Soitec High Concentration Solar PV System

References

Photovoltaic power stations in the United States
Solar power stations in California
Solar power in the Mojave Desert